In road traffic, the term no entry often refers to the signages used in one-way traffic.

No entry may also refer to:
No Entry, a 2005 Hindi film directed by Anees Bazmee
No Entry, a 1954 novel written by Monica Edwards